Richard Tüngel (1893 – 1970) was a German journalist and publisher, originally an architect and a longtime Director of Construction (Baudirektor) in Hamburg.

Life 
Removed from this position by the Nazis in 1933, he went to Berlin, where he lived until 1945 as a translator and writer. For example, one still finds his name on current German-language editions of Igor Stravinsky's memoirs. Immediately after the war, he was one of the co-founders of Die Zeit, initially as fiction editor (Feuilletonchef) and a bit later as editor-in-chief.

After that it is remarkably difficult to find biographical information about him, not least because he had a rather inglorious departure from Die Zeit: He had to leave, after Marion Dönhoff had provoked a scandal by enforcing a decision concerning the political line of the paper. Tüngel, who was described by his successor as editor-in-chief as "...helpful and inconvenient. Brilliant and the embodiment of antagonism and artistic temperament," (Ralf Dahrendorf in his biography of Gerd Bucerius), stood politically on the right and was steering Die Zeit into a current "farther right than the CDU" (the German Christian Democratic Union). In 1955, the "difficult, but at the same time respected and feared" man (Dahrendorf's expression, again) had to resign. The years-long arguments between Bucerius and the newspaper's co-founders, which had started as early as 1949, ended in 1956 because Tüngel was no longer a partner.

The book Auf dem Bauche sollst du kriechen... Deutschland unter den Besatzungsmächten (Upon thy belly shalt thou go... Germany under the Occupying Powers) published  in 1958, which Tüngel wrote together with journalist Hans Rudolf Berndorff, is sometimes referred to as his "memoirs". The book was reissued by Matthes & Seitz Berlin Verlag under the title Stunde Null. Deutschland unter den Besatzungsmächten (Zero Hour: Germany under the Occupying Powers). In this work, the two authors describe their experience of the immediate post-war years, and so one learns a bit about the founding of Die Zeit. Beyond that, one must form one's own opinion of this man, who does not make it easy to form a simple verdict. Those that would like to see a balanced, but critical, view can take a look at the German-language Die Herren Journalisten. Die Elite der deutschen Presse nach 1945 (The gentlemen journalists: the elite of the German press after 1945) by Lutz Hachmeister and Friedemann Siering, (Beck, Munich, 2002). He is of course also mentioned in the biographies of Marion Dönhoff, e.g. the one by Alice Schwarzer, and in the correspondence between Dönhoff and Gerd Bucerius, published in 2004.

External links 
 Zeit.de: Wie alles begann (german)

1893 births
1970 deaths
German newspaper editors
Die Zeit founders
Architects from Hamburg
German male non-fiction writers
German journalists
German male journalists
20th-century German journalists
20th-century German newspaper publishers (people)
German newspaper publishers (people)
Die Zeit editors